List of rivers of Louisiana (U.S. state).

By drainage basin
This list is arranged by drainage basin, with respective tributaries indented under each larger stream's name.

Gulf of Mexico

East of the Mississippi
Pearl River
Bogue Chitto River
The Rigolets
Lake St. Catherine
Lake Pontchartrain
Lacombe Bayou
Tchefuncte River
Bogue Falaya
Abita River
Tangipahoa River
Sims Creek
Pass Manchac
Lake Maurepas
Tickfaw River
Natalbany River
Ponchatoula Creek
Blood River
Amite River
Bayou Manchac
Comite River
Blind River
Petite Amite River
New River
Bayou Bienvenue

Mississippi River
Mississippi River

Distributaries
Bayou Lafourche
Atchafalaya River
Bayou Cocodrie
Bayou Teche
Bayou Boeuf
Bayou Long
Belle River
Big Goddel Bayou
Bay Natchez
Chopin Chute
Lower Grand River
Upper Grand River
Bayou Plaquemine
Rouge Bayou
Bayou Jack
Bayou des Glaises

Tributaries
Bayou Pierre
Coles Creek
Yazoo River
Red River

Red River
Red River
Black River
Little River
Castor Creek
Dugdemona River
Tensas River
Bayou Macon
Ouachita River
Boeuf River
 Bayou Bonne Idee
Bayou Lafourche (Boeuf River tributary)
Big Creek
Bayou D'Arbonne
Cornie Bayou
Bayou de Loutre
Bayou Bartholomew
Cane River
Saline Bayou
Black Lake Bayou
Bayou Pierre
Prairie River
Loggy Bayou
Flat River
Red Chute Bayou
Bodcau Bayou
Dorcheat Bayou
Cross Bayou
Twelvemile Bayou
Black Bayou

Gulf west of the Mississippi
Vermilion River
Bayou Carencro
Bayou Fusilier
Bayou Bourbeux
Mermentau River
Bayou Queue de Tortue
Bayou Nezpique
Bayou des Cannes
Bayou Mallet
Bayou Plaquemine Brule
Bayou Wikoff
Calcasieu River
West Fork Calcasieu River
Houston River
Ouiski Chitto Creek
Sabine River
Old River
Bayou Anacoco

Alphabetically

Abita River
Amite River
Antoine Creek
Atchafalaya River
Bay Natchez
Bayou Bartholomew
Bayou Bienvenue
Bayou Bourbeux
Bayou Bonfouca
Bayou Carencro
Bayou Chicot
Bayou Choupic
Bayou Courtableau
Bayou des Cannes
Bayou des Glaises
Bayou Fusilier
Bayou Jack
Bayou Lafourche, Mississippi River distributary
Bayou Lafourche (Boeuf River tributary)
Bayou Long
Bayou Macon
Bayou Mallet
Bayou Manchac
Bayou Nezpique
Bayou Pierre
Bayou Pierre
Bayou Plaquemine Brule
Bayou Plaquemine (Grand River tributary)
Bayou Queue de Tortue
Bayou Teche
Bayou Wikoff
Big Goddel Bayou
Black Bayou
Black Lake Bayou
Black River
Blind River
Boeuf River
Bogue Chitto River
Bogue Falaya
Calcasieu River
Cane River
Castor Creek
Chopin Chute
Coles Creek
Comite River
Dorcheat Bayou
Dugdemona River
Flat River
Houston River
Irish Bayou
Little River - tributary of the Black (Ouachita) River
Loggy Bayou
Mermentau River
Mississippi River
Natalbany River
New River
Old River (Louisiana), in Pointe Coupee and West Feliciana parishes
Old River (Sabine River tributary)
Ouachita River
Ouiski Chitto Creek
Pass Manchac
Pearl River
Ponchatoula Creek
Prairie River (Louisiana)
Red River
Rouge Bayou
Rigolets
Sabine River
Saline Bayou
Sims Creek
Tangipahoa River
Tchefuncte River
Tensas River
Tickfaw River
Twelvemile Bayou
Vermilion River
Yazoo River

References

USGS Geographic Names Information System
USGS Hydrologic Unit Map - State of Louisiana (1974)

See also

List of rivers in the United States

Louisiana
 
Rivers